Totally Captivated (완전무결하게 사로잡히다 lit. Totally Captivated by Mookyul), is a Boys Love manhwa series of Hajin Yoo, first released in 2005 by eComiX and was licensed by Netcomics. The story began when Ewon Jung, the hero of the series, cheated on his boyfriend Jiho simply out of curiosity, and was dumped because of it. After a couple of months, Jiho happened to see Ewon again, and started his revenge by asking Mookyul, his current boyfriend and also a mafia boss, to force Ewon to be a servant in his office. This initiated Ewon troubles such that he earned his life philosophy: “I’m pretty sure that the downfall of humans can be completely attributed to their curiosity.”

Characters 
 Ewon Jung: main character. He is a college student and current Saehan Credit Union employee. His life changes after he cheated on Jiho, who got  revenge on him by making him work for Mookyul. During the time that he works as a servant in the office, he finds out that he and his mafia boss Mookyul share a history together, which ultimately brings them intimacy.
 Mookyul Eun: He has movie star looks, and is the boss of Saehan Credit Union Office. His face is always stunned even when he is enjoying bullying Ewon at work. On finding out that Ewon is the boy he met 10 years ago, his feelings for Ewon changed, and now he always only has his eyes on him. 
 Jiho Shin:He is Ewon's ex-boyfriend, and goes to the same school as him. He started dating Mookyul when his heart was broken by Ewon, but in fact, Jiho still has feeling for Ewon, yet he cannot stand Ewon’s continuous cheating. When Jiho accidentally walks in during Mookyul and Ewon’s intimate moment, he decides to give up, and let Mookyul and Ewon be together, because he confesses that he actually only used Mookyul to get revenge on Ewon.

References 

2005 comics debuts
Manhwa titles